Patrick Cahill LLB (died 1886) was the founder and editor of the Leinster Leader newspaper, a political activist who supported Irish Nationalist causes such as the Land League and Home Rule.

He was born in Castletown, County Laois and was educated at St. Patrick's, Carlow College, where his uncle was the distinguished orator and natural philosopher Dr. Daniel William Cahill. At Carlow he studied for and obtained an LLB from the University of London.

He founded the Leinster Leader in 1880 in Naas, Co. Kildare.

He was arrested as part of his political activities once in Kilkenny Gaol, later he was jailed in Clonmel under the Coercion Act of 1881.
His brother was the Rev. Thomas Cahill, S.J., became president of the Jesuit College in Melbourne, Australia.

References

1886 deaths
People from County Laois
Alumni of Carlow College
Year of birth missing
Irish newspaper editors